Tuwali language is a native language indigenous to Ifugao. It is mainly spoken in the whole province. Its different varieties distinguish the municipality.

Kiangan is the oldest town in the province. It derives its name from Kiangan, an ancient village near the bank of the Ibulao River across the Lagawe valley.

References

Further reading

External links
Online version of Hohulin and Hohulin's (2014) dictionary and grammar sketch hosted by SIL International

Central Luzon languages
Languages of Ifugao